The 2014 Tre Valli Varesine was the 94th edition of the Tre Valli Varesine single-day cycling race. While previous editions were held in August, the 2014 edition was raced on 18 September. The organizers of the race planned to attract more top-rank riders by moving the date of the race towards closer to the World Championship, so that cyclist who planned to compete in the World Championship could participate to the Tre Valli Varesine in preparation. The race started in Luino and concluded in Varese, after 199.4 km.

Teams
A total of 23 teams and 181 riders took part to the race

Results

References

Tre Valli Varesine
Tre Valli Varesine
Tre Valli Varesine